Sir Brian William Hone OBE FACE (1907–1978) was an Australian headmaster and, in his youth, a first-class cricketer.

Brian was born on 1 July 1907 in the Adelaide suburb of Semaphore, South Australia, to Dr. Frank Sandland Hone and his wife Lucy née Henderson, 
He was educated at Prince Alfred College and the University of Adelaide (B.A. Hons, 1928) where he won Blues in cricket, football and tennis. During the 1929–30 cricket season he opened the batting for South Australia, scoring a century against Victoria and averaging nearly 50. In 1930 he was awarded a Rhodes Scholarship to attend New College, Oxford (B.A., 1932; M.A., 1938), and achieved honours in English. (C. S. Lewis was his tutor).  He won Blues in cricket and tennis.

Brian was the brother of Garton Hone. He and his wife Enid had four children: civil engineer Christopher, academic Judith, corporate lawyer Geoffrey, and sportsman and educator David.

1933–1939: Taught at Marlborough College, Wiltshire, and was made head of the new department of English. While in England he wrote Cricket Practice and Tactics, (London, 1937).

1940–1950: Headmaster, Cranbrook School, Sydney.

1951–1970: Headmaster, Melbourne Grammar School.

1973–1974: Deputy Chancellor, Monash University.

He died in Paris on 28 May 1978. His remains lie near the Norfolk Island pine planted in Dr J E Bromby's honour in the grounds of Melbourne Grammar School. He was a descendant of William Hone, via William's son the sculptor Alfred Hone.

Selected bibliography
R. M. Jukes, Liber Melburniensis, 4th edn, Melbourne Church of England Grammar School (Melbourne, 1965)
J. W. Hogg, Our Proper Concerns (Sydney, 1986)
C. E. Moorhouse, "Sir Brian Hone", Unicorn, Vol 14 No 1, February 1988
C. E. Moorhouse, Challenge and Response (Melbourne, 1989)

Reference and notes

External links
Photo of B Hone, Third Headmaster, Cranbrook School, 1940–1950.
Photo of Brian William Hone, circa 1940.

Australian Rhodes Scholars
1907 births
1978 deaths
People educated at Prince Alfred College
University of Adelaide alumni
Australian cricketers
South Australia cricketers
Oxford University cricketers
Alumni of New College, Oxford
Australian headmasters
Chairmen of the Headmasters' Conference of the Independent Schools of Australia
Cricketers from Adelaide
Gentlemen cricketers
Wiltshire cricketers
Melbourne Grammar School
Academic staff of Monash University
Sportsmen from South Australia